NCryptoki is a library for .NET Framework that implements the PKCS#11 specifications and supplies an API for C#, VB.NET, Visual Basic 6, Delphi and other COM interop languages for integrating a PKCS#11 compliant token in any application.
NCryptoki maps the cryptoki's functions defined in PKCS#11 specifications in a set of high level .NET classes for C# and VB.NET and proposes a programming paradigm that allows to integrate your PKCS#11 compliant token in your applications with a few lines of code.
NCryptoki supplies also a Silverlight 5 assembly and a COM interface that allows to use the supplied classes in any language that supports COM interop like Visual Basic 6, Delphi, etc.

Main features 
 Compliant with PKCS#11 2.20 specifications
 Compliant with any PKCS#11 smart card/token/HSM
 32 or 64 bit platform
 .NET Framework 2.0, 3.0, 3.5 and 4.0
 Silverlight 5
 Java SE 6 or later

COM interface 
NCryptoki supplies also a COM interface that allows to use the supplied classes in any language that supports COM interop like Visual Basic 6, Delphi etc.

Programming paradigm 
The programming paradigm is very similar to the one described in C programming language in PKCS#11 specifications: the PKCS#11 C functions are mapped into a set of .NET classes that follows the same classification described above.

External links 
 NCryptoki Home: http://www.ncryptoki.com

.NET Framework software
Microsoft Silverlight